VIA Eden is a name of a variant of VIA's C3/C7 x86 processors, designed to be used in embedded devices. They have smaller package sizes, lower power consumption, and somewhat lower computing performance than their C equivalents, due to reduced clock rates. They are often used in EPIA mini-ITX, nano-ITX, and Pico-ITX motherboards.  In addition to x86 instruction decoding, the processors have a second undocumented Alternate Instruction Set.

The Eden is available in four main versions:

 Eden ESP: Samuel 2 and Nehemiah cores (300 MHz-1.0 GHz) - EBGA 35mm×35mm package, 66/100/133 MHz FSB
 Eden-N: Nehemiah core (533 MHz-1.0 GHz) - NanoBGA 15mm×15mm package, 133 MHz FSB
 Eden: Esther core (400 MHz-1.2 GHz) - NanoBGA2 21mm×21mm package, 400 MT/s FSB
 Eden ULV: Esther core (500 MHz-1.5 GHz) - NanoBGA2 21mm×21mm package, 400 MT/s FSB

The Eden ULV 500 MHz was the first variant to achieve a TDP of 1W .

See also
 List of VIA Eden microprocessors

References

External links

 VIA Eden Processors - Low Power Fanless Processing
 VIA's Small & Quiet Eden Platform

Eden